Hurricane Rosy is a 1979 Italian-French comedy film written and directed by Mario Monicelli. It is loosely based on a novel by Carlo Brizzolara.

Cast 
 Gérard Depardieu as Raoul Lamarre
 Faith Minton as Rosy "Hurricane Rosy" Spelman / Temporale Rosy 
 Jean Claude Levis as Kunta Kinte 
 Lola García as Jeanne 
 Kathleen Thompson as Trudy 
 Roland Bock as Mike Fernandez 
 Helga Anders as Charlotte 
 Charles Bollet as Arbitro  
 Gianrico Tedeschi as The Count

References

External links

1979 films
Commedia all'italiana
Films directed by Mario Monicelli
Films based on Italian novels
1979 comedy films
Films produced by Alberto Grimaldi
Films with screenplays by Age & Scarpelli
Professional wrestling films
1970s Italian films